Count Pirro Capacelli Albergati (20 September 1663 – 22 June 1735) was an Italian aristocrat, and amateur composer.

Albergati was born in Bologna.  The Albergatis were one of the most eminent families of the Bolognese nobility, and Count Pirro Albergati himself was ambassador, confidant of Leopold I, Emperor of Austria, member of the city Council of Elders, and gonfaloniere of the city of Bologna.
"Although posterity has recognized Pirro Albergati for his musical accomplishments, he was probably better known to the general public for his charitable works".(Victor Crowther The oratorio in Bologna 1650-1730)

From 1685 he became a member of the confraternity Santa Maria della Morte for whom he composed most of his 17 oratorios. From 1728 Albergati also held the mainly honorary post of maestro di cappella in Puiano near Urbino in the last years of his life. His sacred works include 4 masses.

Fellow Bolognese composer Giuseppe Maria Jacchini dedicated his opus 4 to Count Albergati in recognition of his strong support for giving Jacchini a permanent position in the orchestra of the cathedral of Bologna.

Works
Published works:
 Op. 1 Balletti, correnti, sarabande e gighe per Violino, Violone, con il secondo violino beneplacito. 1682, reprinted 1685
 Op. 2 Suonate a due violini col suo basso continuo. Bologna 1683
 Op. 3 Cantate morali a voce solo, 1685
 Op. 4 Messa e salmi concertati. 1687
 Op. 5 "Plectro armonico" Dieci Sonate da Camera à due Violini, e Basso con Violoncello obligato (Bologna 1687)
 Op. 6 Cantate da camera a voce sola 1687
 Op. 7 Motetti e antifoni della B.M.V. 1691
 Op. 8 Concerti varii da Camera a tre, quattro o cinque. Modena 1702
 Op. 9 Cantate spirituale a 1 2 3 vv. F. Rosati Modena 1702
 Op. 10 Cantate ed Oratorio San Eustachio 1714
 [  ] Inno e antifone della B.M.V. a voce sola. Silvani, Bologna 1715
 [  ] Cantate in pregio di Santa Maria. "Op6." Bologna 1717
 Op. 13 Corona dei pregi di Maria a 1 voce 1717
 Op. 14 Caprici varii da camera a tre. Venice 1721
 Op. 15 Motetti con il responsorio di S. Antonio di Padova a 4, 1715
 Op. 16 Messe e Litanie della B.M.V. e Tantum ergo a 4, (Bologna ?) Venice 1721

Oratorios (surviving):
 L’innocenza di Sant’Eufemia 1694
 Il Convito di Baldassarro, 1691
 La Beata Caterina da Bologna tentata di solitudine, 1710 Bologna
 San Eustachio in Op.10 1714

Lost works:
 Serenata a 2 vv 1692
 Opera Gli amici 16 August 1699, Bologna
 Opera Il principe selvaggio 1712, Bologna
Oratorios:
 Nabucodonosor 1686
 Giobbe 1688
 Santa Orsola 1689
 L'Iride di pace, o sia il B. Niccolò Albergati 1690
 Il martirio di S Sinibaldo 1696
 Il ritorno dalla capanna 1696
 Maria Annunciata dall'Angelo  1701
 Santa Ottilia 1705
 Il Morte di Cristo 1719
 Il trionfo della Grazia, ovvero la conversione di Maddalena 1729
 S Petronio principale protettore di Bologna 1732

Recordings
 Oratorio La Beata Caterina da Bologna tentata di solitudine. Magnificat. Cantate spirituali. Fortuna Ensemble, dir. Roberto Cascio  TC.660101
 Oratorio Il Convito di Baldassarro 1691. Fortuna Ensemble dir. Roberto Cascio TC.660102
 Sacred cantatas: Corona dei pregi di Maria from Op.13 1717. Ensemble La Flora TC.660103

References

1663 births
1735 deaths
Italian Baroque composers
Italian male classical composers
Counts of Italy
18th-century Italian composers
18th-century Italian male musicians